Milton Timothy O'Toole was a member of the Duluth Kelleys of the National Football League.

Biography
O'Toole was born on June 16, 1902, in Trego, Wisconsin. He attended high school in Duluth, Minnesota.

Career
O'Toole was a member of the Kelleys during the 1924 NFL season. He was a guard.

References

1902 births
Year of death missing
People from Washburn County, Wisconsin
Players of American football from Wisconsin
Players of American football from Duluth, Minnesota
Duluth Kelleys players
American football guards